Greytown railway station was the terminus of the Greytown Branch railway, which connected the Wairarapa town of Greytown in New Zealand’s North Island to Woodside on the Wairarapa Line.

History 
In 1878, Parliament authorised the construction of the Greytown Branch, and the following year, after the completion of a survey, plans were drawn up and tenders called. The contract for the construction of the Greytown station building, goods shed and locomotive shed was let to Ebenezer Gray for £1183. Construction was completed on time.

The opening of the line on 14 May 1880 was to have been a grand affair, with a parade led by a brass band, followed by local charitable societies, school children and the general public. These festivities were to have been followed by sporting events including teams from Wellington and Greytown. Foul weather on the day meant that much of what had been planned was cancelled, and the first train from Wellington brought with it few visitors.

Until the opening to Masterton on 1 November 1880, Greytown was the effective northern terminus of the Wairarapa Line. The Greytown to Woodside section then became a branch railway.

Today 
With the closure of the Greytown Branch in 1953, the locomotive shed was demolished and the station building was relocated by train to Woodside to serve as a goods shed, where it remains. The station's goods shed survives on its original site.  Though there have been proposals to move it to the railway heritage precinct at Carterton railway station, it was restored in 2015 to a condition reminiscent of its appearance in commercial service.

The station yard is at the southern end of West Street in Greytown, and is noticeable by the large hump in the road as you pass the goods shed. A road transport company and row of large trees now occupy much of the yard and where the station building used to be.

Gallery

References 

 

Rail transport in Wellington
Defunct railway stations in New Zealand
Railway stations opened in 1880
Railway stations closed in 1953
Buildings and structures in the Wairarapa
Greytown, New Zealand